A Notion in Perpetual Motion is a live album by European jazz group the Vienna Art Orchestra recorded in Switzerland which was first released in 1985 on the Hat ART label as a double LP as Perpetuum Mobile then re-released in 1992 as a single CD.

Reception

The Allmusic review stated: "the most notable thing about the Vienna Art Orchestra is its stage presence: Rüegg knows how to create drama and surprise and his musicians are more than up to the challenge, clearly delighting themselves in the process. A Notion in Perpetual Motion is as close to a "perfect" live recording of the VAO as you are likely to find".

Track listing
All compositions by Mathias Rüegg except where noted
 "Sighs from South-Carinthia" – 11:01
 "Woodworms in the Roots" – 8:42
 "Voices Without Words" – 5:25
 "Life at the Dead Sea" – 9:46
 "Lady Delay" – 9:27
 "Romana" – 6:04
 "A Natural Sound" – 3:12
 "'Round Midnight" (Thelonious Monk, Cootie Williams, Bernie Hanighen) – 8:37
 "French Alphorn" – 8:53
 "H.M. Blues" (Bhumibo Adoleaydej) – 5:27
 "Zoge Am Boge" – 4:50 Omitted from CD reissue

Personnel
Mathias Rüegg − arranger, conductor 
Lauren Newton - voice
Karl "Bumi" Fian, Hannes Kottek − trumpet, flugelhorn
Herbert Joos − flugelhorn, alphorn, double trumpet
Christian Radovan − trombone
John Sass − tuba
Wolfgang Puschnig − sopranino saxophone, alto saxophone, bass clarinet, flute, piccolo
Harry Sokal − soprano saxophone, tenor saxophone, flute
Roman Schwaller − tenor saxophone
Uli Scherer − piano, Fender piano, Yamaha DX7
Woody Schabata - marimba, vibraphone
Heiri Kaenzig − bass
Wolfgang Reisinger, Janusz Stefanski - drums, percussion

References

1985 live albums
Hathut Records live albums
Vienna Art Orchestra live albums